Johanna Forsberg (born 16 October 1995) is a Swedish female handball player for IK Sävehof and the Swedish national team.

She represented Sweden at the 2019 World Women's Handball Championship.

Achievements 
SHE:
Winner: 2014, 2015, 2018
Swedish Cup:
Winner: 2023

References

External links

1995 births
Living people
Handball players from Gothenburg
Swedish female handball players
IK Sävehof players
Expatriate handball players
Swedish expatriate sportspeople in Denmark
Nykøbing Falster Håndboldklub players
21st-century Swedish women